Castel Group (French Groupe Castel) is a French beverage company. It was established in 1949 by Pierre Castel, who continues to run the company as a family-owned concern.

Castel is the largest French wine producer and owns the biggest French and foreign wine brands distributed in France. Castel Group is also the French leader for table wines and the number four for beers and soft drinks in Africa (after SABMiller and Heineken and Guinness), and – after Constellation Brands and Gallo – number four for wine worldwide. Castel claims to have  a 25 percent share of profits from the African beer market.

History
Starting with a wine merchant business in Bordeaux, the company steadily expanded in size and scope. Castel grew into other parts of the wine business, first bottling, then acquisition of viniculture lands and brands - Chateau de Goelane, a Bordeaux Superieur, was acquired in 1957 -, later distribution by buying the wine specialty stores of Nicolas (1998) and marketing.

In 2022, French anti-terrorism prosecutors opened an investigation into allegations of potential complicity in war crimes made against Groupe Castel in the Central African Republic (CAR), citing deals to provide armed militia UPC with cash and vehicle support in order to secure regional market position.

Wine
Groupe Castel produces many table wines (vin de table). It expanded its wine offering by buying its main competitor,  Société des Vins de France,  from Pernod Ricard in 1992. The company has a number of well branded wines such as  Baron de Lestac, Roche Mazet, Vieux Papes and La Villageoise. It also bought the Malesan and Sidi Brahim wines. In 2008 the company expanded from the south of France to the Loire valley and the Bourgogne. Higher tier wines are sold by the Chateaux and Estate section of Castel (listed below).

Since 2008 Groupe Castel has made more efforts to decrease its dependence on the French market and become more visible in English speaking countries, Eastern Europe, and the Eastern Asia, primarily China.

As of 2015, Castel owns 1,400 ha of vineyards in France and 1,600 ha in Morocco, Tunisia, and Ethiopia in Africa. It produced 640 million bottles, 59% for the French market.

Beer

In 1990, it purchased a major competitor in African beer, Brasseries et Glacières Internationales (BGI). In 1994 Castel added La Société de Limonaderies et Brasseries d'Afrique (SOLIBRA) that is focused on soft drinks.  In 2003 the company bought Brasseries du Maroc, 2011 Brasseries Star  Madagascar, and 2014 Nouvelle Brasserie de Madagascar.

Major beer brands are Flag and Castel. The company produces 28 million hectolitres of beer and soft drinks in Africa each year.

In 2001, SABMiller acquired 20 percent of Castel's African Beverages operations and Castel acquired 38 percent of SABMiller Africa and SABMiller Botswana. An update of the partnership in 2012 saw the two combine their Nigerian businesses under SABMiller's control with their Angolan businesses set to be handled by Castel.

Other
Castel produces olive oil from Morocco and maintains sugar plantations in Africa.

List of  Castel Chateaux and Estates
 Château d'Arcins
 Château Barreyres
 Château Beychevelle (GCC)
 Château de La Botinière
 Château du Bousquet
 Château Campet
 Château Cavalier
 Domaine de la Clapière
 Château Ferrande
 Château de Goëlane
 Château de Haut Coulon
 Château Hourtou
 Château de l'Hyvernière
 Château Latour Camblanes
 Château du Lort
 Château Malbec
 Château Mirefleurs
 Château Montlabert
 Château Tour Prignac

References

Wineries of France
French brands
Food and drink companies established in 1949
Wine brands
SABMiller
Companies based in Bordeaux
French companies established in 1949
Beer in France